Entally House is a heritage-listed site in Hadspen, Tasmania. It was the family home of Thomas Reibey who was the Premier of Tasmania from 1876 to 1877. The Entally Estate was established in 1819 by Thomas Haydock Reibey (senior). Reiby worked in the East India company, and named the house after the suburb of Entally in Calcutta, India.

In 1978, the house and its outbuildings were registered on the now-defunct Register of the National Estate.

References

External links

Entally Estate - official site
Entally House, discover Tasmania official web site

1819 establishments in Australia
Historic house museums in Tasmania
Tasmanian Heritage Register
Tasmanian places listed on the defunct Register of the National Estate